The Coptic Catholic Eparchy of Minya is a suffragan eparchy (Eastern Catholic diocese) of the Coptic Catholic Church (Alexandrian Rite in Coptic language) in its sole ecclesiastical province, that of the Coptic Catholic Patriarch of Alexandria (whose see is in Cairo).

It has its episcopal see the cathedral of Christ King located in Minya, the capital of the Minya Governorate in Upper Egypt.

History 
Established on 26 Nov 1895 as an Eparchy (Diocese) of Minya (Curiate Italian Ermopoli Maggiore), the territory split off from the Apostolic Vicariate of Egypt.

Ordinaries 
(Coptic Rite)

Suffragan Eparchs (Bishops) of Minya
 Joseph-Maxime Sedfaoui (6 Mar 1896 – death 13 Jan 1925), also Apostolic Administrator of the patriarchate Alexandria of the Copts (Egypt) (1908 – 13 Jan 1925)
 Francesco Basilio Bistauros (10 Aug 1926 – death 30 Nov 1934)
 Giorgio Baraka (8 Jul 1938 – death 9 Dec 1946)
 Archbishop-bishop Paul Nousseir (21 Jan 1950  – 24 Jan 1967)
 Archbishop-bishop Isaac Ghattas (8 May 1967 – death 8 Jun 1977), previously Eparch (Bishop) of Luqsor of the Copts (Egypt) (21 Jun 1949  – 8 May 1967)
 Antonios Naguib (26 Jul 1977  – 29 Sep 2002), later Patriarch of Alexandria of the Copts (Egypt) ([30 Mar 2006] 7 Apr 2006  – 15 Jan 2013), also President of Synod of the Catholic Coptic Church (7 Apr 2006  – 15 Jan 2013), President of Assembly of the Catholic Hierarchy of Egypt (7 Apr 2006  – 15 Jan 2013);  created Cardinal-Patriarch (20 Nov 2010 – ...)
 Ibrahim Isaac Sedrak (5 Oct 2002  – 15 Jan 2013), later Patriarch of Alexandria of the Copts (Egypt) ([15 Jan 2013] 18 Jan 2013 – ...), also President of Synod of the Catholic Coptic Church (15 Jan 2013 – ...), President of Assembly of the Catholic Hierarchy of Egypt (15 Jan 2013 – ...)
 Botros Fahim Awad Hanna (8 Apr 2013  – 7 Oct 2020); previously Titular Bishop of Mareotes (6 Sep 2006  – 8 Apr 2013) & Bishop of Curia of the Copts ([31 Aug 2006] 6 Sep 2006  – 8 Apr 2013)
 Basilios Fawzy Al-Dabe (3 Nov 2020 – ...)

See also 
Catholic Church in Egypt
Coptic Catholic Church

References

External links 
 GCatholic 

1895 establishments in Egypt
Eastern Catholic dioceses in Africa
Coptic Catholic Church
Eastern Catholicism in Egypt